Edwin Harold Smith (February 19, 1909 – March 5, 1958) was an American diver who competed at the 1928 and 1932 Summer Olympics.

In 1928, he finished fourth in the 3m springboard. Four years later in the 1932 Summer Olympics, he won the gold medal in the 10m platform and a silver in the 3m springboard. Domestically,  he won the AAU springboard titles in the 1m in 1928 and 1930; and in the 3m in 1930 and 1931. After the 1932 Olympics, he became a professional show diver, and a diving coach at New York Athletic Club and Yale University. He also prepared the German diving team to the 1936 Summer Olympics. During World War II, he served as a captain in the United States Marine Corps.  After the war, he worked as a pool manager at luxury hotels in Palm Springs and Santa Barbara.  He died at age 49 of cancer.

Honors
In 1979, Smith was inducted into the International Swimming Hall of Fame.

See also
 List of members of the International Swimming Hall of Fame

References

1909 births
1958 deaths
Burials at Forest Lawn Memorial Park (Glendale)
Divers at the 1928 Summer Olympics
Divers at the 1932 Summer Olympics
Olympic gold medalists for the United States in diving
Olympic silver medalists for the United States in diving
American male divers
Medalists at the 1932 Summer Olympics